The BenQ S500 is a mobile phone announced by BenQ in 2005. It has a SXGA (1.3 Megapixels) camera with flash (50 Hz/ 60 Hz). It also has an MP3 player that can be launched by pressing and holding the 'play' button, which is located at the side of the phone. The user can also see which song is being played and the elapsed time even when the phone is not flipped open.

References

BenQ mobile phones
Mobile phones introduced in 2006